Vestal's Gap Road and Lanesville Historic District is a national historic district located in Claude Moore Park at Sterling, Loudoun County, Virginia.  It encompasses 1 contributing building and 1 contributing structure.  They are "Lanesville," a two-story side-gabled frame house on a solid stone-rubble foundation built about 1807, and a section of the former Vestal's Gap Road, an 18th-century road.

It was listed on the National Register of Historic Places in 2000.

References

Historic districts in Loudoun County, Virginia
National Register of Historic Places in Loudoun County, Virginia
Historic districts on the National Register of Historic Places in Virginia